Antillotyphlops catapontus is a species of snake in the Typhlopidae family.

References

catapontus
Reptiles described in 1966